Vikas Tokas (born 16 October 1986) is an Indian cricketer who plays for Delhi cricket team in domestic cricket. He is a right-arm medium-fast bowler who bowls at a speed of over 135kmph. After making his debut for Railways cricket team in 2010, Tokas switched to Delhi in 2012.

References

External links
 

Indian cricketers
Living people
1986 births
Delhi cricketers
Royal Challengers Bangalore cricketers